The ornamented flying fish, or beautyfin flying fish (Cypselurus callopterus), is a species of flying fish of the genus Cypselurus in the family Exocoetidae. The British ichthyologist Albert Günther first described it in 1866 in his eight-volume Catalogue of Fishes (1859–1870).

References 

Cypselurus
Fish described in 1866
Taxa named by Albert Günther